Tofani is a surname. Notable people with the surname include:

Dave Tofani, American saxophonist, woodwind player and composer
Loretta Tofani (born 1953), American journalist

See also 
 Tofani Glacier